The Mount Loretto Spur is an abandoned branch of the Staten Island Railway whose purpose was to serve the Mount Loretto Children's Home. The spur diverged off of the Main Line south of Pleasant Plains.

Description 
The Mount Loretto Spur diverged off of the Main Line south of Pleasant Plains. The branch was a little over a mile long and had a 2% grade. The right-of-way from the Amboy Road grade crossing to Mount Loretto was owned by the Archdiocese of New York, and was not open to the public. Mount Loretto paid for any necessary track maintenance, which was provided by the SIRT. The stop was called the Mission station and was located near Cunningham Road.

History 
The spur was built in 1891 to serve the Mount Loretto Children's Home, and was used to transport excursionists and to provide freight. The line was originally built to bring construction materials for large buildings at Mount Loretto and its powerhouse in the 1890s. Every third Sunday, the SIRT operated a special train from St. George to Mount Loretto for relatives and visitors. The Archdiocese paid for the trips. This direct service ended in 1939 and chartered buses were used afterwards. The trains consisted of three steel cars and a steam locomotive as the line was never electrified.

Abandonment 
The spur received regular freight shipments until the late 1950s, and was abandoned in the early 1960, with the tracks removed soon after. Some ties were still visible until the 1980s. While the spur's junction was removed, the pilings that carried the tracks still exist. Parts of the right-of-way are now a hiking trail. At Mount Loretto, which was destroyed by a fire in December 1973, all that remains is a coal dump trestle.

References

External links
 Mount Loretto Spur track map
 Picture of remains of the spur
 Remains of Spur

Baltimore and Ohio Railroad lines
Rail infrastructure in New York (state)
Railway lines closed in 1950
Railway lines opened in 1891
Staten Island Railway
Closed railway lines in the United States